This article shows the qualification phase for 2019–20 CEV Champions League. 10 teams will play in qualification round. The two remaining teams will join the other 18 teams automatically qualified to the League round based on the European Cups' Ranking List. All 8 eliminated teams will then compete in 2019–20 Men's CEV Cup.

Participating Teams
Drawing of Lots took place on 26 June 2019 in Luxembourg.

First round
 4 teams compete in the first round
 Winners advance to the second round and losers will play in CEV Cup
 All times are Home team time.

|}

First leg

|}

Second leg

|}

Second round
 6 teams received byes in the second round.
 Winners advance to the third round and losers will play in CEV Cup.
 All times are Home team time.

|}

First leg

|}

Second leg

|}

Third round
 4 teams from second round compete in the third round.
 Winners enter the League round and losers will play in CEV Cup.
 All times are Home team time.

|}

First leg

|}

Second leg

|}

References

Qualification
CEV Champions League qualification